Caustis recurvata, commonly known as curly sedge or pubic hair sedge, is a sedge of the family Cyperaceae that is native to Australia.

The species was first formally described by the botanist Kurt Polycarp Joachim Sprengel in 1827 as part of the work Curae Posteriores as published in Systema Vegetabilium. Two synonyms are known; Restio uncinatus and  Caustis uncinata.
 
It is found in coastal sandy heath and mountain heath but mostly along the coast. It extends from south eastern New South Wales north along the coast and into south eastern Queensland.

References

Plants described in 1827
Flora of New South Wales
Flora of Queensland
recurvata